Teldenia helena is a moth in the family Drepanidae. It was described by Wilkinson in 1967. It is found on New Britain and New Ireland.

References

Moths described in 1967
Drepaninae